The Andh language, also known as Andhi, is an Indo-Aryan language of the Marathi–Konkani branch spoken by 100,000 Andhs in India.

It appears Andh may be losing ground with many Andhs speaking Marathi at home.

References

Languages of India
Konkani languages